Knapek is a Slavic masculine surname. In Czech its feminine counterpart is Knapková. The surname may refer to:

Edina Knapek (born 1977), Hungarian fencer
Miroslava Knapková (born 1980), Czech Olympic rower
Miroslav Knapek (born 1955), Czech Olympic rower, father of Mirka

Slavic-language surnames